"Youth Gone Wild" is the debut single from American heavy metal band Skid Row's debut album, released in January 1989.

Background
The song's music video received heavy airplay on MTV; however, as a single it only reached #99 on the US Billboard Hot 100 and reached #27 on the Mainstream Rock Tracks.

The song was re-released as a single in 1992, with a live recording of "Delivering the Goods" (from the band's B-Side Ourselves EP) as the B-side; it charted again at #22 on the UK Singles chart.

Track listing

7" vinyl, CC, Japan mini CD
 "Youth Gone Wild"
 "Sweet Little Sister"

UK 7" shaped vinyl
 "Youth Gone Wild"
 "Rattleshake Snake (live)"

UK 12" vinyl
 "Youth Gone Wild"
 "Makin' A Mess (live)
 "Sweet Little Sister"

Youth Gone Wild/Delivering The Goods UK 7" vinyl, CC (1992)
 "Youth Gone Wild"
 "Delivering the Goods" (live, Judas Priest cover)

Youth Gone Wild/Delivering The Goods UK 12" vinyl, CD (1992)
 "Youth Gone Wild"
 "Delivering the Goods" (live, Judas Priest cover)
 "Psycho Therapy (Ramones cover)"
 "Get the Fuck Out"

Charts

References

Skid Row (American band) songs
1989 songs
1989 debut singles
1992 singles
Songs written by Dave Sabo
Songs written by Rachel Bolan
Atlantic Records singles